In music, Op. 127 stands for Opus number 127. Compositions that are assigned this number include:

 Beethoven – String Quartet No. 12
 Czerny – Rondino for Piano Quintet
 Reger – Introduction, Passacaglia and Fugue
 Schumann – 5 Lieder und Gesänge